STCP might be an acronym or abbreviation for:

Sociedade de Transportes Colectivos do Porto (Porto Public Transport Society)
Scalable Transmission Control Protocol
Student Tax Clinic Program (USA)
See also

Stream Control Transmission Protocol (SCTP)